Priory Integrated College or more commonly known as Priory College or simply Priory is a secondary school located on My Lady's Mile, in Holywood, County Down, Northern Ireland.

It is a co-educational integrated college taking in 11- to 18-year-old pupils from a wide area beyond Holywood, including Millisle, Donaghadee, Bangor, Newtownards, Dundonald and Belfast.

Priory is an Apple distinguished school, and every student is assigned with an educational iPad used for school work, homework, coursework and revision. The school received an iTeach technology award in 2016.

The school offers a range of subjects including; Art and Design, Home Economics, English Language, English Literature, French, Geography, History, Mathematics, Science, Technology and Design, Music, Learning for Life and Work, ICT and P.E. These subjects are compulsory to study at Key Stage 3 Level. At GCSE level the school offers further studies and its main education board of choice is CCEA, but also uses AQA, OCR and Edexcel in certain subjects.

History 
The school was originally named as Holywood High School in its foundation year in 1952. In 1997, the name of the school was changed to Priory Integrated College in order to appeal to all religions and to focus on integrated education after a consultation with parents also came to an agreement. The process of transformation began with funding provided by the Integrated Education Fund.

Sixth Form 

Priory Integrated College enrols pupils from many schools and of varying abilities in its sixth form centre to carry out their AS and A levels. Pupils are able to study A levels and BTECs. The majority of students subsequently go on to degree courses at higher education institutions, including South Eastern Regional College, or universities within the UK for careers with further training.

Sports 

 Aerobics
 Badminton
 Basketball
 Cricket
 Dodgeball
 Football
 Gymnastics
 Hockey
 Netball
 Rounders
 Rugby union
 Tennis
 Track and field
 Volleyball

Extracurricular activities 

 Art club
 Band
 Breakfast club
 Choir
 IT club
 Library
 Music lessons
 Student council
 Trivia
 Voluntary work

See also 
 List of integrated schools in Northern Ireland
 List of secondary schools in Northern Ireland

Notable pupils 

 Matty Burrows- A professional footballer from Northern Ireland who plays for Ards F.C. in the IFA Premiership, and was on the shortlist for the 2010 FIFA Puskas Award.
Stephen Monroe aka Stephen Monroe on the radio

References

External links
 Priory Integrated College official website

Integrated schools in County Down
Secondary schools in County Down
Holywood, County Down